HD 158476 is a supergiant star in the southern constellation of Ara. There is a faint magnitude 10.5 companion at an angular separation of 20.0″ along a position angle of 209° (as of 2013).

References

External links
 HR 6513
 CCDM J17318-4602
 Image HD 158476

Ara (constellation)
158476
Double stars
F-type supergiants
6513
085788
Durchmusterung objects